Šip may refer to:

 Šip (Pale), Bosnia and Herzegovina
 Šip (Višegrad), Bosnia and Herzegovina

See also
 SIP (disambiguation)